Jimmy McGill (2 October 1939 – October 2006) was a Scottish footballer, who played as a defender in the Football League for Oldham Athletic, Crewe Alexandra, Chester and Wrexham. He played more than 360 football games in his professional career.

References

Chester City F.C. players
Crewe Alexandra F.C. players
Wrexham A.F.C. players
Association football defenders
English Football League players
Macclesfield Town F.C. players
Oldham Athletic A.F.C. players
Partick Thistle F.C. players
1939 births
2006 deaths
Footballers from Bellshill
Scottish footballers